The 2019 Lamar Hunt U.S. Open Cup tournament proper will feature teams from all five tiers of the men's American soccer pyramid.

Qualification for the 2019 tournament includes local qualifying matches contested by 94 amateur teams scheduled to take place in 2018.  One team also qualified by winning the 2018 National Amateur Cup, and other clubs playing in national leagues that are not fully professional qualify based on their results in 2018 league play. Clubs playing in fully professional leagues may enter the tournament proper and bypass the qualification process.

Qualification procedures
The United States Soccer Federation's (U.S. Soccer) Open Cup Committee manages both the tournament proper and the local qualification process.

Clubs based in the United States that play in a league that is an organization member of U.S. Soccer are generally eligible to compete for the U.S. Open Cup, if their league includes at least four teams and has a schedule of at least 10 matches for each club.

U.S.-based teams in Division I, II and III professional leagues qualify for the U.S. Open Cup automatically, provided they are eligible. To be eligible, these teams must be members in good standing of their leagues on December 31, 2018, and remain so through the 2019 U.S. Open Cup Final. The league must also remain in operation through the U.S. Open Cup Final. A new Division I, II or III professional league must have its match schedule announced to the public by January 31, 2019, and the first match must be scheduled for no later than seven days before the first scheduled round of the U.S. Open Cup tournament proper that involves the team's division. If a new club joins an existing Division I, II or III league, the league must meet the aforementioned criteria applicable to new leagues in order for the new club to be eligible for the U.S. Open Cup.

A professional team that is majority owned by a higher-level professional team or whose player roster is materially managed by a higher-level professional team is ineligible to participate in the U.S. Open Cup.

Clubs that are below Division III are Open Division teams. To be eligible for the 2019 U.S. Open Cup, an Open Division team must have been a playing member in good standing of its league on August 13, 2018, and remain so through the 2019 U.S. Open Cup Final. The league must have been in operation since no later than July 14, 2018, and remain so until the 2019 U.S. Open Cup Final. A team that started its first season of competition in an existing league must have started its new league's schedule no later than July 14, 2018.

Starting in 2019, the winner of the previous year's National Amateur Cup automatically qualifies for the U.S. Open Cup. The cup winner enters the tournament proper in the first round with the other Open Division clubs.

National leagues may elect to use the results of their previous year's seasons to determine which of their teams qualify for the U.S. Open Cup in lieu of having their teams play local qualifying matches. If a national league so elects, its teams are not eligible to participate in local qualifying. To qualify as a national league, the league must
 Have a minimum of 50 active U.S.-based teams in good standing,
 Have a common championship each season that is only available to league teams and is compulsory,
 Use a league format with a standings table as opposed to a single-elimination (knockout) format,
 Have teams in at least three U.S. time zones among Eastern, Central, Mountain and Pacific, with the three time zones containing the most teams each having at least 15% of the member teams,
 Have two time zones represented by at least three different U.S. states or the District of Columbia and a third time zone represented by at least two different U.S. states or the District of Columbia,
 Have teams in at least 10 different U.S. states or the District of Columbia,
 Have played for at least three years meeting the above criteria and
 Timely pay the team-based Open Cup entry fee for all teams in the league.

Both leagues which currently qualify as national leagues, the National Premier Soccer League (NPSL) and USL League Two (formerly the Premier Development League, or PDL), elected to use the results of their 2018 seasons to determine their qualifying teams for the 2019 U.S. Open Cup. National leagues determine their own procedures for ranking teams based on 2018 results for the purposes of 2019 U.S. Open Cup qualification.

Eligible Open Division clubs that did not win the National Amateur Cup and are not members of national leagues must have submitted an application to enter local qualifying by August 13, 2018.

Once applications for local qualifying are approved, U.S. Soccer estimates the number of Open Division teams needed in the U.S. Open Cup, based on the anticipated participation of professional teams. One of these slots is allocated to the National Amateur Cup champions. The remainder are allocated among the pool of local qualification teams and the national leagues, based on the relative number of teams in each, resulting in a target number of local qualifiers. The number of rounds of local qualifying and the number of teams receiving byes in the first round of qualifying are then established to set the number of local qualifiers as close as possible to the target number. Byes are distributed randomly and are meant to avoid unnecessary travel but are kept to a minimum to preserve the integrity of the qualification tournament. Once the qualification tournament format has been finalized, the number of local qualifiers becomes fixed, unless a team that qualifies later becomes ineligible. After the December 31, 2018 professional clubs entry application deadline, the final number of Open Division teams needed in the 2019 U.S. Open Cup will become known. From this number, the fixed number of local qualifiers plus one for the National Amateur Cup champion are subtracted to determine the number of slots for clubs from the national leagues. These slots are allocated among the leagues based on their relative numbers of U.S.-based eligible teams.

National league track

National Premier Soccer League
The NPSL ranked the top 30 of its 98 U.S.-based clubs based on results of its 2018 season for the purposes of qualification for the 2019 U.S. Open Cup. The NPSL champion earned the top ranking, and the other finalist is second. The national semifinal loser from the region with the larger number of teams is ranked third, and the remaining national semifinalist is ranked fourth. The four regional final losers are ranked fifth through eighth based on the number of teams in their region, from largest to smallest. The remaining 22 slots in the rankings are allocated among the regions based on their sizes. The total number of slots allocated to each region are South 9, Northeast 8, Midwest 7 and West 6. Since U.S. Soccer has not yet determined how many berths NPSL clubs will be awarded in the U.S. Open Cup, each of the 22 slots available in the rankings for teams that did not reach the region finals are each allocated to a specific region. This ensures that, regardless of the number of berths awarded to NPSL clubs, the berths will have been allocated as fairly as possible, taking into account the relative sizes of the regions. The allocation of the ninth through 30th slots for 2019 qualifying is as follows:

Starting with the ninth slot, no conference that already has a team in the rankings may have an additional team claim a slot, until every conference in the region has at least one team in the rankings. Ties in the standings are broken using regular-season conference tiebreaker procedures.

Notes:

USL League Two
USL League Two elected to use the results of the 2018 PDL regular season to rank its 69 U.S.-based teams for the purposes of qualification for the 2019 U.S. Open Cup. The highest placing teams from each division, provided that they are American, are ranked first in order of points. The remaining teams are then ranked based on points regardless of division. The 2018 PDL regular-season standings tiebreaker system is invoked when needed. The rankings of the USL League Two teams for 2019 U.S. Open Cup qualification are shown in the table below.

Notes:

National Amateur Cup
Milwaukee Bavarian SC defeated West Chester United, 2–0, to win the 2018 National Amateur Cup and qualify for the 2019 U.S. Open Cup. The seven winners of the fourth round of local qualifying will join them as the eight Open Division teams in the tournament proper.

Local qualifying
U.S. Soccer originally announced that 95 teams would participate in local qualifying. However, Naples United FC 2 was disqualified, because the club was not affiliated with the U.S. Specialty Sports Association by the deadline for local amateur sides to participate in sanctioned league competition.

Four rounds of local qualifying matches will result in 7 clubs advancing to the tournament proper.

First qualifying round
The first qualifying round matches were scheduled to be played on September 22 and 23. Some matches were played on later dates due to weather delays.

Northeast Region

Mid-Atlantic Region

Received bye to second round of qualification:
Rochester River Dogz 
Tartan Devils Oak Avalon

Southeast Region

Received bye to second round of qualification:
Central Florida FC Spartans 
Hurricane FC 
Shahin Atlanta FC

Central Region

Notes:

Received bye to second round of qualification:
 Aurora Borealis Soccer Club
 FC Maritsa
 FC Minnesota

Mountain Region

Received bye to second round of qualification:
 Boise Cutthroats FC
 San Juan FC
 Southwest FC
 Sporting AZ FC

Southern California Region

Notes:

Received bye to second round of qualification:
 Chula Vista FC

West Region

Received bye to second round of qualification:
 Contra Costa FC
 IPS/Marathon Taverna
 Napa Sporting SC
 Nevada Coyotes FC
 Real San Jose

Second qualifying round
The second qualifying round matches were played on October 20 and 21, with the exception of one that was postponed until November 11, due to flooding.

Northeast Region

Mid-Atlantic Region

Notes:

Southeast Region

Central Region

Notes:

Mountain Region

Southern California Region

West Region

Third qualifying round
The third qualifying round matches were played on November 17 and 18. Three matches were postponed to a later date. One match was suspended while the two teams were tied, and will be replayed January 16.

Northeast Region

Mid-Atlantic Region

Southeast Region

Central Region

Mountain Region

Southern California Region

Notes:

West Region

Fourth qualifying round
The fourth qualifying round matches were played on April 6 and 7. The game between Florida Soccer Soldiers and America Soccer Club, originally scheduled for April 7, was cancelled and awarded to Florida after America SC was disqualified from the tournament for leaving the United Premier Soccer League (UPSL).

Northeast Region

Mid-Atlantic Region

Southeast Region

Central Region

Mountain Region

Southern California Region

West Region

Top goalscorers

See also
2018 NPSL season
2018 PDL season

References

External links
 U.S. Soccer Federation

U.S. Open Cup
2018 in American soccer